A kennel is a structure or shelter for dogs. Used in the plural, the kennels, the term means any building, collection of buildings or a property in which dogs are housed, maintained, and (though not in all cases) bred. A kennel can be made out of various materials, the most popular being wood and canvas.

Breeding kennels
This is a formal establishment for the propagation of dogs, whether or not they are actually housed in a separate shed, the garage, a state-of-the-art facility, or the family dwelling. Licensed breeding kennels are heavily regulated and must follow relevant government legislation. Breed club members are expected to comply with the general Code of Ethics and guidelines applicable to the breed concerned. Kennel clubs may also stipulate criteria to be met before issuing registration papers for puppies bred. A kennel name or kennel prefix is a name associated with each breeding kennel: it is the first part of the registered name of a pedigreed dog which was bred there.

Boarding kennels
This is a place where dogs are housed temporarily for a fee, an alternative to using a pet sitter.  Although many people worry about the stress placed on the animal by being put in an unfamiliar and most likely crowded environment, the majority of boarding kennels work to reduce stress. Many kennels offer one-on-one "play times" in order to get the animal out of the kennel environment.  Familiar objects, such as blankets and toys from home, are also permitted at many kennels. Many kennels offer grooming and training services in addition to boarding, with the idea being that the kennel can be the owner's "one-stop shop" for all three services.

In the United States the term boarding kennel can also be used to refer to boarding catteries and licensing agencies do not always differentiate between commercial boarding kennels for dogs and other animal or cat boarding kennels. In 2007 market surveys showed that $3.0 billion was spent on these services. Annual kennel boarding expenses for dog owners was $225, and for cat owners was $149 according to a 2007–2008 survey.

See also
Animal shelter
Dog camp
Doghouse
 
Pet House

References

External links 
 
 

Buildings and structures used to confine animals
Dogs